A gnomon is the part of a sundial that casts the shadow. 

Gnomon may also refer to:

 Gnomon (figure), in geometry, a plane figure formed by removing a similar parallelogram from a corner of a larger parallelogram
 Gnomon (journal), a German language academic journal of classics
 Gnomon (novel), a science fiction novel by Nick Harkaway
 Gnomon, the difference between a pair of consecutive figurate numbers
 Gnomon, one of the twenty-five fictional islands in the fantasy book series The Books of Abarat
 Gnomon School of Visual Effects, a Hollywood-based university

See also 
 Gnomonic projection